Long Way from Home may refer to:

 Long Way from Home (EP), a 1979 EP by Whitesnake
 Long Way from Home (album), a 2017 album by Peter Cincotti
 A Long Way from Home, a 1969 album by Brownie McGhee and Sonny Terry
 "Long Way from Home", a song by Krokus from Change of Address
Long Way from Home, a 1975 novel by Michael Morpurgo